The Black Scholar (TBS), the third-oldest journal of Black culture and political thought in the United States, was founded in 1969 near San Francisco, California, by Robert Chrisman, Nathan Hare, and Allan Ross. It is arguably the most influential journal of Black Studies and central to the very emergence of that field. After being renewed and reinvigorated in 2012, it has continued its influence. In 2017, The Princeton Review of Academic Journals ranked it the number-one journal of Black Studies in the United States. Its associated Black Scholar Press has published books since the 1970s.  The journal is currently housed at Boston University's Program in African American Studies.

Production
The Black Scholar's editor-in-chief is the scholar and writer Louis Chude-Sokei, author of works including The Last Darky: Bert Williams, Black on Black Minstrelsy and the African Diaspora (Duke University Press, 2005) and The Sound of Culture: Diaspora and Black Technopoetics  (Wesleyan University Press, 2015). Shannon Hanks-Mackey is the managing editor. Of all Black journals in the U.S., only the NAACP’s The Crisis (founded in 1910) and the Journal of African American History (formerly The Journal of Negro History, founded in 1916) have been publishing for a longer period of time.[1] TBS is owned by the Robert Chrisman Foundation, a Seattle, Washington-based non-profit educational organization, and is published quarterly by Routledge/Taylor & Francis.

Original editorial board
Robert Chrisman (1937–2013) and Nathan Hare (b. 1933) were active in the 1968 Black and ethnic studies battles at San Francisco State University. Hare had been hired to coordinate a Black Studies program, the first in the United States, and to write a proposal for a department of Black studies, which Black students wanted to have as a fully independent department. As a consequence of a five-month student-faculty strike, the first and the longest strike for Black studies in the US academy, Hare, who was arrested twice for activities during the strike, was fired and Chrisman was removed as a professor from tenure track. The strike experience motivated Chrisman and Hare to create a venue outside of the academy for Black knowledge production.

In November 1969, Hare (publisher), Chrisman (editor) and Allan Ross, a white Bay Area printer (as business manager) founded The Black Scholar: A Journal of Black Studies and Research to cover issues of social, cultural, economic and political thought. Its opening issue, "The Culture of Revolution", featured articles by Eldridge Cleaver, Amiri Baraka, Sékou Touré, and Stokely Carmichael, among others, with Nathan Hare writing the lead article on the First Pan African Cultural Festival Cultural Festival held in Algiers in the summer. There he obtained articles from African intellectuals such as Sékou Touré, as well as Eldridge Clever and his rival, Stokely Carmichael, both of whom had just expatriated to Africa.

Early members of the editorial and advisory board included Shirley Chisholm, Imamu Baraka, Angela Davis, Sonia Sanchez, Chuck Stone, Dempsey Travis, Max Roach, John Oliver Killens, Ossie Davis, Shirley Graham Du Bois, Ron Karenga, and Lerone Bennett. Robert L. Allen (b. 1942) joined the journal as associate editor in 1974, then rose to senior editor (during the shakeup surrounding Nathan Hare's departure and Robert Chrisman's move to the position of publisher, later editor and publisher), while Robert Allen remained senior editor until his retirement in 2012.

Departure of Hare and Ross
Nathan Hare left The Black Scholar in 1975 during an ideological dispute. In his open letter of resignation, Hare accused other board members of conspiring to further a Black Marxist agenda at the expense of competing ideologies. Writing of Hare's resignation, The New York Times called The Black Scholar the most important Black journal since The Crisis magazine of W. E. B. DuBois. Allan Ross had left a year or so earlier, but Hare declined his entreaties to leave with him. Robert Allen was brought in to replace Ross on the Board but in the position of associate editor, with Ross's assistant (Gloria Bevien) taking his place as business manager. Allan Ross died in 1974. Then Hare left in the spring of 1975.

The public split attracted coverage from national newspapers. The New York Times covered the story in an article titled "Ideology Dispute Shakes Black Journal", while the New York Amsterdam News headline read "Black Reds Take Over Black Scholar!"

Notable issues
The Black Scholar published a special issue entitled "The Black Sexism Debate" (Vol. 10, No. 8/9, May/June 1979); this was one of the first public scholarly forums about sexism within the African-American community, and it generated controversy due to contradictory positions on gender equality. The issue featured responses from feminists, intellectuals, and artists to Robert Staples’ controversial essay, “The Myth of the Black Macho: A Response to Angry Black Feminists,” which had been published in the previous issue of TBS. Staples had criticized the work of Michele Wallace and Ntozake Shange. The editors of the journal viewed the issue as a means of clarifying the relationship between Black men and women while forging solidarities among them.

Over a decade later, when millions of people were fascinated by Clarence Thomas’ hearings in the Senate prior to his being confirmed to the Supreme Court, TBS compiled a special issue. Scholars and historians commented on the issues of sexism and racism in the Clarence Thomas/Anita Hill controversy (Vol. 22, No. 1/2, Winter 1991–Spring 1992). The essays were later published as Court of Appeal: The Black Community Speaks Out on the Racial and Sexual Politics of Thomas vs. Hill (1992).

Most recently, the journal has published a variety of notable special issues, which have begun to participate in the reshaping of Black Studies in the wake of new generations of institutional Black academics as well as in the wake of new political activism and cultural conversation around race, power, knowledge, and politics.  Examples include the award-winning issue on Dominican Black Studies (Vol. 45, No. 2, Summer 2015); a roundtable on the ABC television drama Scandal (Vol. 45, No. 1. Spring 2015); States of Black Studies (Vol. 44, No. 2, Summer 2014); and The Role of Black Philosophy (Vol. 43, No. 4, Winter 2013).  Also, there have been cutting-edge issues focused on race and environmental justice (Fall 2016); technology such as Black Code (Fall 2017); Black Studies in South Africa (Summer 2017) and Black Experimental Poetics (Spring 2017).

TBS has also focused on debates around sex and sexuality in the Black world, for example, with a wildly popular roundtable on "Race, Pornography and Desire" (Winter 2016) and with issues on Black Masculinity and the first collection of writings by and about Black Queer and Trans issues and aesthetics.

The journal has always explored Black American issues through a broader context of Black transnational experiences, and through an explicit global/pan-African lens. In 1977, for example, TBS published a special issue on Cuba, featuring essays from artists, activists, and intellectuals who had been enabled to visit Cuba through the initiative of the journal’s board.[9] It has also devoted issues to Southern Africa, Latin America, the Caribbean and addresses issues from all points of the Black world.

Notable contributors
The Black Scholar was founded on the principle that all Black authors, scholars, and activists could take part in dialogues within its pages. It has been dedicated to finding and developing new talent while also continuing to publish established authors. TBS has retained its non-discriminatory policy of publishing intellectuals from a variety of professions outside of academia. For example, TBS has featured articles by US Congress representatives Shirley Chisholm, Ron Dellums, Barbara Lee, and activists such as Julian Bond, Herb Boyd, Amílcar Cabral, Eldridge Cleaver, Nawal El Saadawi, Cheddi Jagan, Julius Nyerere, Bobby Seale, and Kwame Ture (Stokely Carmichael).

The journal has regularly showcased creative writers from across the Black world. Opal Palmer Adisa, Margaret Walker Alexander, Amiri Baraka, Dennis Brutus, Frank M. Chipasula, Wanda Coleman, Jayne Cortez, René Depestre, Ernest J. Gaines, Nicolás Guillén, June Jordan, Jackie Kay, Yusef Komunyakaa, Audre Lorde, Nancy Morejón, Agostinho Neto, Ngũgĩ wa Thiong'o, May Opitz, Ishmael Reed, Andrew Salkey, Sonia Sanchez, Ntozake Shange, Wole Soyinka and Alice Walker have been published in issues of TBS over the years.

The journal has promoted a wide ideological spectrum of Black scholarly and artistic talent including Derrick Bell, Horace Campbell, Clayborne Carson, Elizabeth Catlett, John Henrik Clarke, Darlene Clark Hine, Johnnetta B. Cole, Carolyn Cooper, St. Clair Drake, Katherine Dunham, E. Chukwudi Eze, Kevin Gaines, Henry Louis Gates Jr., Lewis R. Gordon, Farah Jasmine Griffin, Beverly Guy-Sheftall, Patricia Hill Collins, Joy James, E. Patrick Johnson, Peniel Joseph, Thabiti Asukile, Kara Keeling, Robin D. G. Kelley, Treva B. Lindsey, Julianne Malveaux, Manning Marable, J. Lorand Matory, Tavia Nyong'o, Adolph Reed, Christina Sharpe, Barbara Smith, Hortense Spillers, Catherine Squires, Chuck Stone, and Ronald Walters.

Furthermore, TBS has been recognized for its timely and significant interviews, such as the now famous dialogues with Muhammad Ali, Maya Angelou, Arthur Ashe, James Baldwin, Octavia Butler, Alex Haley, Darcus Howe, C. L. R. James, Jacob Lawrence, Queen Mother Audley Moore, Jack O'Dell, Walter Rodney, McCoy Tyner, George Yancy, and Robert F. Williams.

The journal has been home to celebrated essays from activists and academics alike. Angela Davis’s now canonized essay "Reflections on the Black Woman's Role in the Community of Slaves", written while she was in prison, was first published in TBS in 1971, Vol. 3, No. 4. She was still in prison on murder and kidnapping charges linked to George Jackson’s attempted escape from the Marin County Hall of Justice when the article was printed. TBS’ archives at UC Berkeley also house the last published writing by George Jackson while he was alive (Vol. 2, No. 10, June 1971), printed just two months before his fatal attempt to escape incarceration.

The journal continues to feature the most influential of contemporary Black scholars, critics and activists, from Gerald Early to Louis Chude-Sokei, Alexis Pauline Gumbs, Mark Anthony Neal, Nathaniel Mackey, Aldon Lynn Nielsen, Anthony Reed, Evie Shockley, David Marriott, Dionne Brand, Anthony Walton, Stephanie Batiste and many more.

Activist involvement
Activism has always been a founding premise of The Black Scholar. As a result of student and faculty agitation and strikes in the late 1960s, a Black Studies department was inaugurated at San Francisco State University. Robert Chrisman and Nathan Hare, along with other African-American faculty, were a part of the advisory board created to hire faculty for the new department. As activists in the Civil Rights Movement and the student movements of the 1960s (for instance, Nathan Hare was a leader of the Black University movement and fired at Howard University before his recruitment to San Francisco State), the founders of TBS used the journal not only as a publication informed by community activism but also as a hub for further activist work that addresses social inequality based on race, class, and gender in the United States and abroad.

Many of TBS’ contributing and advisory editors have been involved with social and political activism such as organizing a political prisoners' fund, protests against the Vietnam War, trips to Cuba and revolutionary Nicaragua, a trip to the Eastern Bloc in 1985, and a speaker’s bureau to arrange speaking engagements for diverse thinkers of varying disciplines and experiences in and outside traditional academia. Founder Robert Chrisman represented TBS at a conference held in Havana, Cuba, where a large American delegation met with Angolan leaders Commandante Dibalo, Ogla Lima, and Pedro Zinga Baptista in support of the MPLA. A few months later Chrisman represented TBS at the Angola Support Conference, which opposed U.S. and South African intervention in Angola.

The published works produced by TBS editors have also promoted activism by spreading awareness of racial injustices. As a result of Robert L. Allen’s publication The Port Chicago Mutiny, which shed light on the unjust and unsafe working conditions that Black Navy servicemen sustained during wartime efforts, social activists were inspired to rectify the injustices of the Port Chicago disaster. The surviving service members were honored by a group of California State Assemblymen in 1998, more than 50 years after these men were charged with mutiny for refusing to work under unsafe conditions. One of the men involved also received an official pardon by President Bill Clinton.

Robert Chrisman’s retirement
On June 30, 2012, founding editor Robert Chrisman officially retired from his long-standing position as Editor-in-Chief and Publisher of The Black Scholar. He publicly announced his retirement in a letter published on the back page of the Spring 2012 issue of TBS. Chrisman claimed that through the creation and the dissemination of such materials TBS was able to “establish a foundation and platform for late 20th-century Black criticism and scholarship." In his letter, Chrisman made reference to the transitioning direction and goals of the journal in the light of changes in the field of Black Studies and the intellectual interests of scholars and activists within it.

He ended his letter thanking those who provided support throughout his tenure, including his executive assistant Jacki Frommé, typographer Rick Giezentaner, Pat Scott, and Conyus Calhoun. Since retiring, Chrisman completed his third volume of poems, The Dirty Wars, published in summer 2012 by Black Scholar Press, and continued to work on another volume of poetry entitled Minotaur and to work with Robert L. Allen on The Black Scholar archive at UC Berkeley. Chrisman died after a long illness on March 10, 2013.

Black Scholar Press
Black Scholar Press was based in San Francisco, California. It began publishing books beginning in the 1970s, mostly regarding social science or poetry. Notable titles include: 
 Sonia Sanchez, I've Been A Woman: New and Selected Poems. Black Scholar Press, 1978
 Andrew Salkey, Land. Black Scholar Press, 1979
 Robert Chrisman, Children of Empire. Black Scholar Press, 1981
 Robert Staples, Black Masculinity: The Black Male's Role in American Society. Black Scholar Press,  1982
 Kenneth A. McClane, A Tree Beyond Telling. Black Scholar Press, 1983
 Nancy Morejon, trans. Kathleen Weaver, Where the Island Sleeps Like a Wing: Selected Poetry. Black Scholar Press, 1985 
 D. L. Crockett-Smith, Cowboy Amok: Poems. Black Scholar Press, 1987
 William McClendon (ed. Robert Chrisman), Straight Ahead: Essays on the Struggle of Blacks in America, 1934-1994. Black Scholar Press, 1995
 Robert Chrisman, The Dirty Wars. New Poems. Black Scholar Press, 2012

Anthologies
The editors of The Black Scholar have published anthologies of notable articles from the journal, including:
 Robert Chrisman and Nathan Hare (eds), Pan-Africanism, 1972
 Robert Chrisman and Nathan Hare (eds), Contemporary Black Thought: The Best of The Black Scholar, Bobbs-Merrill, 1974
 Court of Appeal: The Black Community Speaks Out on the Racial and Sexual Politics of Thomas vs. Hill (edited by The Black Scholar), Ballantine Books, 1992
 Charles P. Henry, Robert L. Allen and Robert Chrisman (eds), The Obama Phenomenon: Toward a Multiracial Democracy, University of Illinois Press, 2011.

Archive
The Black Scholar archive was endowed to the African American Writers Collection at UC Berkeley’s Bancroft Library, which is "one of the largest and most heavily used libraries of manuscripts, rare books, and unique materials in the United States", as a means of furthering education on African-American history and social issues for future generations.

"Launched in 1978, The Bancroft Library’s African American Writers Collection contains thousands of books, manuscripts, correspondence, photographs, and other rare works by African American authors," ranging in date from the 1790s to contemporary society. Along with TBS’s extensive archive, the African American Writers Collection also houses the NAACP Archival Project and the Records of the Brotherhood of Sleeping Car Porters.

References

External links
 The Black Scholar website.
 "African Americans in California", The Bancroft Library.
 "The Black Scholar FBI file".

Black studies publications
African-American magazines
Literary magazines published in the United States
Political magazines published in the United States
Quarterly magazines published in the United States
Magazines established in 1969
Magazines published in the San Francisco Bay Area